Khalled Loualid (born 3 March 1941) is a Tunisian former footballer. He competed in the men's tournament at the 1960 Summer Olympics.

References

External links
 
 

1941 births
Living people
Tunisian footballers
Tunisia international footballers
Olympic footballers of Tunisia
Footballers at the 1960 Summer Olympics
Association football goalkeepers
Espérance Sportive de Tunis players